Pysmenne is an urban-type settlement in Synelnykove Raion of Dnipropetrovsk Oblast in Ukraine. It belongs to Vasylkivka settlement hromada, one of the hromadas of Ukraine. Population: 

Until 18 July 2020, Pysmenne belonged to Vasylkivka Raion. The raion was abolished in July 2020 as part of the administrative reform of Ukraine, which reduced the number of raions of Dnipropetrovsk Oblast to seven. The area of Vasylkivka Raion was merged into Synelnykove Raion.

Economy

Transportation
Pysmenne is on a railway which connects Dnipro via Synelnykove with Pokrovsk. There is a passenger railway station in the settlement.

Pysmenne is also included in a relatively dense network of roads of eastern Dnipropetrovsk Oblast. It has access to Vasylkivka and Synelnykove, and from there to Dnipro, Zaporizhzhia, and Donetsk Oblast.

References

Urban-type settlements in Synelnykove Raion